Kirchensur is a village in the municipality of Amerang in the district of Rosenheim in Bavaria, Germany.

Geography 
Kirchensur is located in the Chiemgau, about six kilometres northeast of Amerang, seven kilometres northwest of Obing, eight and a half kilometres in the west of Wasserburg am Inn and four kilometres southwest of Schnaitsee.

History 
Kirchensur was first mentioned in the 10th century as "Sur", which means as much as acidic water. In the 13th century Kirchensur was an Obmannschaft and from 1800 up to the connection to Amerang (1970) a separate municipality. 
1876 the village got its own school, which existed until the integration into the school of Eiselfing (1969). 
The time of establishment of the church is not confirmed, but probably it existed before the beginning of the 11th century..
In the 16th century Kirchensur consisted of about ten buildings, 1914 of about 15 and nowadays already of 41 buildings (with house numbers).

Literature 
 Konrad Linner: Haus- und Hofgeschichte 1366–2010

External links 

 Homepage of Kirchensur (in German)

Villages in Bavaria